This is a list of cities with a population above 100,000, as listed in the 2011 Census of India in the Indian state of Odisha:

List of urban agglomerations of Odisha
In the census of India 2011, an urban agglomeration has been defined as follows:

"An Urban Agglomeration is a continuous urban spread constituting a town and its adjoining outgrowths (OG), or two or more physically contiguous towns together with or without outgrowths of such towns. An urban agglomeration must consist of at least a statutory town and its total population (i.e. all the constituents put together) should not be less than 20,000 as per the 2001 Census. In varying local conditions, there were similar other combinations which have been treated as urban agglomerations satisfying the basic condition of contiguity."

Urban agglomeration constituents
Urban agglomeration constituents with a population above 1 lakh (100,000 persons) as per the 2011 Census are shown in the table below.

Abbreviations: M Corp.= municipal corporation, M= municipality, NAC= notified area committee, CT = census town, IT= industrial town, OG= outgrowth

Constituents
The constituents of urban agglomerations in Odisha, with a population of 1 lakh or above, are noted below:
 Bhubaneswar Urban Agglomeration includes: Bhubaneswar Town (M Corp.), Industrial & Colony Area (OG), Patrapada (OG), Sijua (OG), Ransinghapur (OG), Sarakantara (OG), Bahadalpur (OG), Ebaranga (OG), Raghunathpur (OG), Kalarahanga (OG), Injana (OG), Rokat (OG), Kesora (OG), Koradakanta (OG), and Bankual (OG).
 Cuttack Urban Agglomeration includes:  Cuttack (M Corp.), Choudwar Town (M), and Industrial Area (OG)
 Rourkela Urban Agglomeration includes: Rourkela Industrial Township (IT), I.D.L.Factory & Other Colony Area (OG), Rourkela Town (M corp.), Kalunga Industrial Estate & Other Colony Area (OG), Jalda Town (CT)
 Berhampur Urban Agglomeration includes: Berhampur (M Crop.), Gopalpur (NAC) and Chatrapur (NAC)
 Puri Urban Agglomeration includes: Puri(M), Puri Sadar (OG) and Konark (NAC)
 Paradeep Urban Agglomeration includes: Udachandrapur (OG), Chauliapalanda (OG), Sandhakuda (OG), Bijayachandrapur(OG) and Bhitaragarh (OG)
 Sambalpur Urban Agglomeration includes:  Sambalpur Town (M), Dhankauda & Mathapali Area (OG), Burla Town (NAC), Amsadha Katapali Area (OG), and Hirakud Town (NAC)
 Balasore Urban Agglomeration includes:  Baleshwar Town (M), Baleshwar Industrial Estate (OG), and Remuna Town (NAC)
 Bhadrak Urban Agglomeration includes:  Bhadrak (M), Randia (OG), Sarmanga (OG), Koranta (OG), Boudhpur (OG), Samaraipur (OG), Erei Town (CT)
 Baripada Urban Agglomeration includes: Baripada Town (M), Podaastia Business Center Area (OG), Subarnarekha Irrigation Project Colony (OG), and Indupahi (OG)

References

Cities
Odisha